Trotwood is a city in Montgomery County, Ohio, United States and is a suburb of Dayton. 

The population was 24,431 at the 2010 census. It is part of the Dayton Metropolitan Statistical Area. The city is served by the Trotwood-Madison City School District.

History
Trotwood was originally called Higgins Station, and under the latter name was platted in 1854.

The Village of Trotwood was incorporated in 1901 from portions of Madison Township (the township itself was established in 1809); in 1996 the village and township merged into a single political entity. This merger resulted in the creation of a Trotwood neighborhood (Townview) that is completely surrounded by the City of Dayton. Several smaller sections are attached to Trotwood by only a roadway or a small strip of land. The merger also added a large rural area to this suburban community consisting of farms, golf courses, and large rural estates.

On May 27, 2019, Trotwood sustained significant damage from an EF-4 tornado that swept through Dayton area.  The city suffered damage to 500 homes and 59 homes were destroyed. The Memorial Day tornado struck at 11:00 p.m. after the National Weather Service issued a tornado warning at 10:30 p.m.

Geography

Wolf Creek, a tributary of the Miami River, runs through Trotwood providing fishing and many scenic areas.  Along Wolf Creek is the only state park in Montgomery County.  The  Sycamore Woods State Park at 4675 N. Diamond Mill Road, Trotwood, Ohio offers horseback riding, hiking, hunting, and group camping.

The city is adjacent to the cities of Dayton, Clayton (since Clayton merged with its surrounding Randolph Township in 1998) and Englewood.

Demographics

2010 census
As of the census of 2010, there were 24,431 people, 10,404 households, and 6,408 families living in the city. The racial makeup of the city was 28.1% White, 68.2% African American, 0.2% Native American, 0.3% Asian, 0.5% from other races, and 2.6% from two or more races. Hispanic or Latino of any race were 0.9% of the population.

There were 10,404 households, of which 30.0% had children under the age of 18 living with them, 31.5% were married couples living together, 24.8% had a female householder with no husband present, 5.3% had a male householder with no wife present, and 38.4% were non-families. 33.9% of all households were made up of individuals, and 12.8% had someone living alone who was 65 years of age or older. The average household size was 2.29 and the average family size was 2.91.

The median age in the city was 41.8 years. 23.6% of residents were under the age of 18; 8.2% were between the ages of 18 and 24; 21.8% were from 25 to 44; 28.6% were from 45 to 64; and 17.8% were 65 years of age or older. The gender makeup of the city was 44.4% male and 55.6% female.

2000 census
As of the census of 2000, there were 27,420 people, 11,110 households, and 7,343 families living in the city. The population density was 898.1 people per square mile (346.8/km). There were 12,020 housing units at an average density of 393.7 per square mile (152.0/km). The racial makeup of the city was 38.66% White, 58.34% African American, 0.32% Native American, 0.24% Asian, 0.01% Pacific Islander, 0.43% from other races, and 1.98% from two or more races. Hispanic or Latino of any race were 0.82% of the population.

There were 11,110 households, out of which 30.3% had children under the age of 18 living with them, 40.3% were married couples living together, 21.5% had a female householder with no husband present, and 33.9% were non-families. 29.8% of all households were made up of individuals, and 10.9% had someone living alone who was 65 years of age or older. The average household size was 2.40 and the average family size was 2.96.

In the city the population was spread out, with 26.2% under the age of 18, 7.5% from 18 to 24, 26.6% from 25 to 44, 23.8% from 45 to 64, and 15.9% who were 65 years of age or older. The median age was 38 years. For every 100 females, there were 83.7 males. For every 100 females age 18 and over, there were 76.7 males.

The median income for a household in the city was $34,931, and the median income for a family was $40,426. Males had a median income of $33,771 versus $26,324 for females. The per capita income for the city was $18,329. About 13.6% of families and 15.3% of the population were below the poverty line, including 22.0% of those under age 18 and 11.3% of those age 65 or over.

Tourism and attractions
Trotwood was the home of Hara Arena, where the annual Dayton Hamvention was held, until Hara Arena closed in 2016.  Every year, thousands of Amateur Radio Operators from around the world attend this convention.

Trotwood is also home to United Theological Seminary, one of thirteen seminaries of the United Methodist Church.

Trotwood has two golf courses: Moss Creek, and Hara Greens. Larch Tree Golf Course was sold in 2012 and is no longer a golf course.

In popular culture

Roscoe Filburn, defendant in the 1942 Supreme Court case of Wickard v. Filburn, which permitted the Federal Government to regulate intrastate commerce under the Interstate Commerce Clause, farmed near 5150 Denlinger Road in what is now urban Trotwood.

Trotwood is the alleged childhood home of John Dorian on the television show Scrubs.

Trotwood, OH is the confirmed childhood home of legendary detective Thomas J. Cope.

Education
Trotwood has a public library, a branch of the Dayton Metro Library.

Notable residents

Chris Wright, professional basketball player
Vincent M. Ward, actor

See also
Kon-Tiki Theatre (1968-1999)

References

External links
 City website

Cities in Montgomery County, Ohio
Cities in Ohio